B. M. Kaval may refer to:

 Binnamangala Manavarthe Kaval or BM Kaval, former village and present neighborhood in Bangalore
 Baiyyappanahalli Manavarthe Kaval, a neighborhood in Bangalore
 Badamanavarthekaval or BM Kaval, a village in Bangalore South Taluk, Bangalore Urban district